"I'll Sail This Ship Alone" was the third and final single to be taken from the Beautiful South's debut album, Welcome to the Beautiful South. The single reached number 31 on the UK Singles Chart in December 1989. The track was remixed for its release as a single, whereas the album version was mainly a simple piano and strings production, the drums were more prominent on the single version.

References

1989 singles
1989 songs
The Beautiful South songs
Go! Discs singles
Song recordings produced by Mike Hedges
Songs written by David Rotheray
Songs written by Paul Heaton